Nyassia Arrondissement  is an arrondissement of the Ziguinchor Department in the Ziguinchor Region of Senegal. The principal town is Nyassia.

Subdivisions
The arrondissement is divided administratively into 2 rural communities (Communautés rurales) and in turn into villages.

Communautés rurales

Arrondissements of Senegal
Ziguinchor Region
Populated places in the Ziguinchor Department